Alhena (AKL-38) was a Design 381 (Vessel, Supply, Diesel, Steel, 177') built for the United States Army as FS-257. The Army vessel was U.S. Coast Guard crewed, serving in the  Southwest Pacific during World War II.

The ship was acquired by the United States Navy 12 December 1951, named Alhena and loaned to the Republic of Korea the same day. She was the second ship of the United States Navy to bear the name but had no U.S. Navy service under the name. The ship was returned from loan January 1960, struck the next month and sold for scrap in June 1960.

Ship history

U.S. Army (1944–1951)
FS-257 was laid down in 1944 by Wheeler Shipbuilding, Whitestone, New York, yard number 71, for delivery to the United States Army. On 24 June 1944 the U.S.  Coast Guard manned freighter was commissioned at New York with  Lt. G. P. Hammond, USCG as commanding officer. On 26 June FS-257 departed for the Southwest Pacific operating there through the landings at Leyte. In July 1945 the ship ran aground in the general vicinity of Maripipi island and was assisted off the beach by FS-406.

U.S. Navy/Republic of Korea service (1951–1960)
On 12 December 1951, during the Korean War, FS-257 was acquired by the United States Navy, named Alhena, after the third largest object in the Gemini constellation, and on the same day loaned to Republic of Korea for service with the Republic of Korea Navy. She left Korean naval service in January 1960, and was returned to U.S. custody shortly thereafter. On 1 February 1960, she was struck from the Naval Register.

Fate
She was sold for scrap to Hong Kong Rolling Mills, Ltd. in June 1960. The ship is listed among a registry of naval vessels that contained asbestos in her construction.

Footnotes

See also
FS-255
 (FS-256)

References

External links
 under AKL/AK/APD(경량수송함/수송함/고속 전투 수송함) (Photos of FS type vessels in Korean service)

Design 381 coastal freighters
Ships of the United States Army
Ships of the United States Navy
Ships of the Republic of Korea Navy
1944 ships
Ships built in Queens, New York